Axinandra zeylanica is a species of plant in the Crypteroniaceae family. It is endemic to Sri Lanka, where locally known as "pol hunna - පොල් හුන්න".

References

zeylanica
Endemic flora of Sri Lanka
Vulnerable flora of Asia
Taxonomy articles created by Polbot